Portrait of a Man may refer to one of a number of works by Titian:
Portrait of a Man (Titian, Indianapolis)
Portrait of a Man (Titian, New York)
Portrait of Benedetto Varchi, also called Portrait of a Man